Spiracantha is a genus of flowering plants in the Vernonieae tribe  within the daisy family.

Species
The only known species is Spiracantha cornifolia, native to Puerto Rico, Hispaniola, Venezuela, Colombia, Central America, and southern Mexico (Veracruz, Tabasco, Yucatán Peninsula).

References

Vernonieae
Monotypic Asteraceae genera
Flora of Central America
Flora of South America
Flora of the Caribbean
Flora of Southeastern Mexico
Flora of Veracruz